Malougrenyovo is a rural locality (a selo) and the administrative center of Malougryonovsky Selsoviet, Biysky District, Altai Krai, Russia. The population was 2,413 as of 2013. There are 36 streets.

Geography 
Malougrenyovo is located on the Biya River, 12 km east of Biysk (the district's administrative centre) by road. Solnechnaya Polyana is the nearest rural locality.

References 

Rural localities in Biysky District